Ray Kennedy is an Irish news presenter and award winning journalist who currently works for Raidió Teilifís Éireann (RTÉ), Ireland’s national television and radio station as its weekend anchor for the main television news programmes Six One News, Nine O'Clock News and One O'Clock News.

He is former Ireland correspondent for Sky News in Dublin. He was also one of the Sky News Ireland's two anchors for its weeknightly programmes.

Career
Before joining Sky News, Kennedy worked as a reporter and news anchor for Irish channels RTÉ and TV3. His career began in 1989, working as a reporter with the Irish Independent and Irish Press newspaper groups before radio and television presenting.

He has held the posts of Political Correspondent with Independent Network News (INN). Weekend Anchor TV3, and Ireland Correspondent Sky News International. He is currently the Weekend Anchor at RTÉ News.
In 2016 he won the Justice Media Award television journalist category for the coverage of the Gorse Hill repossession case. In 2017 he was shortlisted for the Amnesty International Media Awards for reporting on poverty in Brazil ahead of the Rio Olympics.
In 2006 he was nominated one of Ireland's favourite news presenters at the TV Now Awards.

Work
Overseas assignments have included the funeral of Princess Diana in 1997 and the war and refugee crisis in Kosovo 1999. He covered the 2004/05 Asian tsunami for Sky News live from Thailand, and was also dispatched to Rome by Sky for the death of Pope John Paul II and election of Pope Benedict XVI. In 2004 Ray Kennedy covered the US presidential election live from Washington, D.C.

He has spent time working from Sky News centre in London. He also broadcast from the Fox News studios in Washington DC with Brit Hume and John Gibson.

He provided three hours of live coverage on Sky News for the 1916 Easter Rising - 90th anniversary military parade in Dublin.  He broadcast live commentary on Sky News international for the state funeral of former Taoiseach Charles Haughey.

He left Sky News in 2008 returning to RTÉ News and Current Affairs.

On 19 September 2022, Kennedy was the presenter of RTÉ's coverage of the funeral of Queen Elizabeth II from London, along with Kate Egan.

References

External links

1970 births
Living people
Alumni of Dublin Institute of Technology
RTÉ newsreaders and journalists
People from Clontarf, Dublin